Anthopteryx is a monotypic snout moth described by Harrison Gray Dyar Jr., an American entomologist, in 1914. Its single species, Anthopteryx irichampa, described in the same publication, is found in Panama.

The wingspan is about 14 mm. The forewings are grey, shaded with reddish brown except along the costa. The hindwings are pale fuscous and translucent, with pale fringes.

References

Phycitinae
Monotypic moth genera
Moths of Central America